This is a list of cast members from the former ABC daytime soap opera, Port Charles.

Cast

See also
 List of General Hospital cast members
 List of Port Charles characters

External links
 
 SOAPnet PC Page
 Port Charles @ soapcentral.com Page
 Port Charles - SoapZone

Port Charles